Lai Chi Football Team (Chinese: 勵馳體育會), often abbreviated to Lai Chi, is a Macanese football team which currently competes in the 2ª Divisão de Macau.

References

Football clubs in Macau